Santa Lucia, officially the Municipality of Santa Lucia, is a 3rd class municipality in the province of Ilocos Sur, Philippines. According to the 2020 census, it has a population of 25,966 people.

The town celebrates its annual fiesta on December 13, the feast of its patroness, Saint Lucy.

Geography

Barangays
Santa Lucia is politically subdivided into 36 barangays. These barangays are headed by elected officials: Barangay Captain, Barangay Council, whose members are called Barangay Councilors. All are elected every three years.

 Alincaoeg
 Angkileng
 Arangin
 Ayusan (Poblacion)
 Banbanaba
 Bani
 Bao-as
 Barangobong (Poblacion)
 Buliclic
 Burgos (Poblacion)
 Cabaritan
 Catayagan
 Conconig East
 Conconig West
 Damacuag
 Lubong
 Luba
 Nagrebcan
 Nagtablaan
 Namatican
 Nangalisan
 Palali Norte
 Palali Sur
 Paoc Norte
 Paoc Sur
 Paratong
 Pila East
 Pila West
 Quinabalayangan
 Ronda
 Sabuanan
 San Juan
 San Pedro
 Sapang
 Suagayan
 Vical

Climate

Demographics

In the 2020 census, Santa Lucia had a population of 25,966.

Economy

Government 

Santa Lucia, belonging to the second congressional district of the province of Ilocos Sur, is governed by a mayor designated as its local chief executive and by a municipal council as its legislative body in accordance with the Local Government Code. The mayor, vice mayor, and the councilors are elected directly by the people through an election which is being held every three years.

Elected officials

Barangay Officials

References

External links

Philippine Standard Geographic Code
Philippine Census Information
Local Governance Performance Management System

Municipalities of Ilocos Sur